Con Mi Sentimiento (English: With my love), released in 1990, is the seventh album from Mexican pop music singer and actress Lucero, and her first album in Mariachi music with the participation of Mariachi Vargas of Tecalitlan.  Since Lucero was working in the Mexican soap opera "Cuando llega el amor" this album didn't have any promotion, nevertheless the album went gold and platinum in Mexico, with sales of 250,000 copies, and it reached #9 in the Top Regional Mexican Albums in Billboard. Also represents the first time Lucero had a hit in the Hot Latin Tracks in United States as Lucero, with "Te Tuve y Te Perdi" peaking at #22. All the tracks were successful recordings of the Mexican group Los Bukis (written by Marco Antonio Solís). The album was the first collaboration between Lucero and Rubén Fuentes, who produced this album, Lucero De Mexico, Cariño De Mis Cariños, among others. This is the first studio album under the name of "Lucero", since her previous albums were released under her diminutive form "Lucerito"

Track listing 
The album is composed by ten songs, all of them were composed by Marco Antonio Solís.

Singles

Chart performance
This was the first time ever that an album of Lucero entered to the list of Billboard in any category of music. The album made appearance only in the chart of the Top Regional Mexican Albums for 9 weeks, 2 of them were in the top ten; entering and peaking at #9.

References 

1990 albums
Lucero (entertainer) albums